Quamtana is a genus of African cellar spiders that was first described by B. A. Huber in 2003.

Species
 it contains twenty-six species, found only in Africa:
Quamtana biena Huber, 2003 – Congo
Quamtana bonamanzi Huber, 2003 – South Africa
Quamtana ciliata (Lawrence, 1938) – South Africa
Quamtana embuleni Huber, 2003 – South Africa
Quamtana entabeni Huber, 2003 – South Africa
Quamtana filmeri Huber, 2003 – South Africa, Lesotho
Quamtana hectori Huber, 2003 – South Africa
Quamtana kabale Huber, 2003 – Uganda
Quamtana kitahurira Huber, 2003 – Guinea, Angola, Uganda, Burundi, Congo
Quamtana knysna Huber, 2003 – South Africa
Quamtana lajuma Huber, 2003 – South Africa
Quamtana leleupi Huber, 2003 – South Africa
Quamtana leptopholcica (Strand, 1909) – South Africa
Quamtana lotzi Huber, 2003 – South Africa
Quamtana mabusai Huber, 2003 – South Africa, Swaziland
Quamtana mbaba Huber, 2003 – South Africa
Quamtana merwei Huber, 2003 (type) – South Africa
Quamtana meyeri Huber, 2003 – South Africa
Quamtana molimo Huber, 2003 – Lesotho
Quamtana nandi Huber, 2003 – South Africa
Quamtana nyahururu Huber & Warui, 2012 – Kenya, Tanzania
Quamtana nylsvley Huber, 2003 – South Africa
Quamtana oku Huber, 2003 – Cameroon
Quamtana tsui Huber, 2003 – South Africa
Quamtana umzinto Huber, 2003 – South Africa
Quamtana vidal Huber, 2003 – South Africa

See also
 List of Pholcidae species

References

Araneomorphae genera
Pholcidae
Spiders of Africa